Cryptocheilus discolor is a species of pepsid spider wasp which is found in the Mediterranean Basin and the Middle East.

Distribution
From Iberia  and Morocco east through the Mediterranean Basin to Iran and Central Asia.

Biology
Apparently little known, has been recorded feeding on the flowers of ''Mentha pulegium.

References

Pepsinae
Hymenoptera of Europe
Insects described in 1793